Anthony David may refer to:

 Anthony David (neuropsychiatrist), professor of cognitive neuropsychiatry at the Institute of Psychiatry, King's College London
 Anthony David (singer) (born 1971), American R&B singer-songwriter

See also 
 David Anthony (disambiguation)